St. Andrews na Creige is a privately owned golf course located in St. Andrew's, Newfoundland, Canada.

History
St. Andrews Na Creige is a 9-hole (par 35) course located at the edge of the Long Range Mountains in the Codroy Valley of western Newfoundland. The course has plans to add an additional 9-holes and a chalet development.

The property was originally deeded to current owner Pat MacIsaac's great grandfather, Captain John MacIsaac by Queen Victoria in 1889. The deed can be seen, proudly hung, in St. Andrews Na Creige Club House.

See also
List of golf courses in Newfoundland and Labrador

References

Golf clubs and courses in Newfoundland and Labrador
2000 establishments in Newfoundland and Labrador